Shepherd Crest is a ridge in the northern part of Yosemite National Park that divides into Shepherd Crest East and Shepherd Crest West. Shepherd Crest is between North Peak and Excelsior Mountain and near Mount Conness, Mount Warren, Mono Lake, and Tuolumne Meadows.

Climate
According to the Köppen climate classification system, Shepherd Crest is located in an alpine climate zone. Most weather fronts originate in the Pacific Ocean, and travel east toward the Sierra Nevada mountains. As fronts approach, they are forced upward by the peaks (orographic lift), causing moisture in the form of rain or snowfall to drop onto the range.

Climbing

Shepherd Crest has climbs, from  scrambles to a  rock climb.

References

External links and references

 Much information, on Shepherd Crest

Mountains of Tuolumne County, California
North American 3000 m summits
Mountains of Northern California
Sierra Nevada (United States)
Mountains of Yosemite National Park
Ridges of California